Loaded Guns (Italian: Colpo in canna) is a 1975 Italian crime film written and directed by Fernando di Leo and starring Ursula Andress.

Plot
A flight attendant finds herself in the middle of fighting between rival gangs in Naples.

Cast
Ursula Andress as Nora Green
Woody Strode as Silvera
Marc Porel as Manuel
Isabella Biagini as Rosy
Lino Banfi as Commissario Calogero
Aldo Giuffrè as Don Calò
Maurizio Arena as Padre Best

Production
Initially, Ursula Andress' character was written as a bisexual woman, which was dropped when director Fernando di Leo felt it was "too risky for the audience" and that "people didn't even have the term 'bisexual' in their vocabulary at that time [...] No one knew its meaning."

Loaded Guns was filmed at Dear Studios in Rome and on location in Naples.

Style
Loaded Guns was an attempt to blend the crime film and comedy. Rather than being a parody, di Leo examined a serious plot involving a hostess who gets involved in a gang war.

Release
Loaded Guns was released theatrically in Italy on 18 January 1975 where it was distributed by Alpherat. The film grossed 699.455 million Italian lira on its theatrical run in Italy.

The film was released by Raro on DVD in Italy.

Reception
From a retrospective review, Italian film critic and historian Roberto Curti stated that the film was a "failed experiment" noting that most of the films gags are not funny and that the film had a confused plot.

References

Footnotes

Sources

External links
 

1975 films
1970s action films
Italian crime films
Films set in Naples
1970s Italian films